Hatzimichalis or Chatzimichalis is a Greek name. Notable people with the name include:

 Hatzimichalis Dalianis (1775–1828), military leader during the Greek War of Independence
 Christos Hatzimichalis (born 1866), Greek general

See also
Hatzi

Greek-language surnames
Surnames